The Downtown Wenatchee Historic District, located in Wenatchee, Washington, is a historic district listed on the National Register of Historic Places. The district, encompassing , is a collection of commercial, mixed-used, and warehouse buildings located in the central business district of Wenatchee downtown. It contains a total of 57 contributing and 32 noncontributing properties.

The district was added to the National Register of Historic Places in 2008. The Old Post Office Building and the Old Post Office Annex had also been previously listed in the National Register as a single individual property in 1977.

Contributing Properties 
The historical district contains a total of 57 contributing properties, built between 1902 and 1955:
 Old Stone Warehouse Building, 29 North Columbia Street, built c. 1906
 Dow Fruit Company, 101 South Columbia Street, built c. 1920
 Wells and Wade, 231 South Columbia Street, built 1928
 Eagle Transfer, 234 South Columbia Street, built 1922
 Wells and Wade Machine Works Shop, 200-204 South Columbia Street, built c. 1948
 Hamilton Cold Storage, 138 South Columbia Street, built 1925
 Wenatchee Cold Storage, also known as Wells and Wade Hardware, 122 South Columbia Street, built c. 1940s
 Pybus, 3 Orondo Avenue, built c. 1918
 Holland Machine Shop, formerly part of Pybus, 5 Orondo Avenue, built c. 1921
 Building at 13 Orondo Avenue, built c. 1928
 Building at 12 South Columbia Street, built c. 1909
 Fruit Growers Service Building, 10 South Columbia Street, built c. 1926
 Coca-Cola Company Building, now hosting the North Central Regional Library, 16 North Columbia Street, built 1939
 Central Building, 25 North Wenatchee Avenue, built 1912
 Weister Building, 21 North Wenatchee Avenue, built 1906
 J.S. Mooney Building, 19 North Wenatchee Avenue, built 1906
 Public Farmers Market, 9 North Wenatchee Avenue, built 1922
 Doneen Building, 5 North Wenatchee Avenue, built 1929
 Wenatchee Federal Savings & Loan, 5 South Wenatchee Avenue, built 1926
 Rialto Theatre, 7 South Wenatchee Avenue, built 1921
 Building at 9 South Wenatchee Avenue, built 1922
 Wells Morris Hardware, 13 South Wenatchee Avenue, built c. 1902
 Building at 15-17 South Wenatchee Avenue, built 1920
 Morris Hardware, 21 South Wenatchee Avenue, built 1920
 Morris Hardware, 23 South Wenatchee Avenue, built c. 1910
 Halbert Block, 29 South Wenatchee Avenue, built 1910
 Wenatchee Hotel Building, 107 South Wenatchee Avenue, built 1910
 Montgomery Ward, 123 South Wenatchee Avenue, built 1929
 Northwestern Fruit Exchange, also known as Midway Motors, 131 South Wenatchee Avenue, built 1913
 Wells & Wade Hardware Building #1, 201 South Wenatchee Avenue, built 1920
 Wells & Wade Building #2, 221 South Wenatchee Avenue, built 1925
 Wells & Wade Building #3, 223 South Wenatchee Avenue, built 1925
 Wells & Wade Building #4, 225 South Wenatchee Avenue, built 1925
 Columbia Brewing Company, 14 Kittitas Street, built c. 1928
 Old City Jail Building, 238 South Wenatchee Avenue, built 1910
 Wenatchee Cycle Building, 224 South Wenatchee Avenue, built 1929
 B.A. Thayer Building, 222 South Wenatchee Avenue, built 1925
 B.A. Thayer Building, 220 South Wenatchee Avenue, built 1925
 Warren Building, 200-204 South Wenatchee Avenue, built 1920
 Seattle First Bank Building, now hosting Washington Federal Bank, 30 South Wenatchee Avenue, built 1955
 S.H. Kress Building, 22 South Wenatchee Avenue, built 1929
 Building at 16 South Wenatchee Avenue, built 1922
 Building at 12 South Wenatchee Avenue, built 1926
 Mills Brothers Building, 10 South Wenatchee Avenue, built 1906
 Fuller Quigg Building, 103 Palouse Street, built 1913
 Olympia Hotel Building, 2 North Wenatchee Avenue, built 1908
 O.B. Fuller Building, 10 North Wenatchee Avenue, built 1909
 Ellis Forde Building, 14 North Wenatchee Avenue, built 1905
 Classen Drugs, 18 North Wenatchee Avenue, built 1908
 Cascadian Hotel, 102 North Wenatchee Avenue, built 1929
 Bennet's Cascadian Garage, 33-35 North Mission Street, built 1927
 Liberty Theatre, 1 South Mission Street, built 1920
 Eagles Lodge Building, 13-15 South Mission Street, built 1927
 World Hotel, 23 South Mission Street, built 1910
 Garland Building, 111 Orondo Avenue, built 1922
 Old Post Office Building, now hosting the Wenatchee Valley Museum & Cultural Center, 127 South Mission Street, built 1938, also individually listed as U.S. Post Office and Annex
 Old Post Office Annex, 127 South Mission Street, built 1918, also individually listed as U.S. Post Office and Annex

See also
 National Register of Historic Places listings in Washington

References

Historic districts on the National Register of Historic Places in Washington (state)